Casale Marittimo is a comune (municipality) in the Province of Pisa in the Italian region Tuscany, located about  southwest of Florence and about  southeast of Pisa. It is located in the Pisan Maremma.

Casale Marittimo borders the following municipalities: Bibbona, Cecina, Guardistallo.

References

External links

 Official website

Cities and towns in Tuscany